Kakkarakottai is a village in the Orathanadu taluk of Thanjavur district, Tamil Nadu, India.

Kakkaraikkottai is a village of Orathanadu  taluk; the area is about 10 km2, and population is about 5000. This panchayath contains three villages: Kakkaraikkottai west, Kakkaraikkottai east and Vadakkunaththam, respectively. The village is bordered by Thekkur in the west, Pinnayur in the east, Vadakkikottai in north and Karukkadipatti in the south

There is one small river  running through the village. Almost all the lands are occupied by paddy cultivation. This is one of the major work for farmers. A very  big lake is also there in eastern margin of west Kakkaraikkottai.  There are two temples in west Kakkaraikkotttai namely Pillaiyar temple and Avudaiyar temple. If someone wants to go to the village, first he has to go to Orathanadu from Thanjavur by bus and from there are buses for Kakkaraikkottai. From Thanjavur direct bus is going to same village(Bus no. 33)

References 

 

Villages in Thanjavur district